Flavianus was a Roman civil official who served as governor or prefect of Egypt from 364 to 366. He was a native of Illyricum, the only one since the emperor Constantine I to hold the office. On 5 May 365 he received from the emperor Valens an edict on banished bishops, and on 8 June he sent the emperor a report seeking instructions on how to deal with the trinitarian bishop Athanasius. On 5 October 365, Flavianus, alongside the  Victorinus, tried to arrest Athanasius, who escaped. On 1 February 366, he was instructed, through the notary Brasidas, to desist and allow Athanasius to return. Flavianus was succeeded as prefect after 21 July by Proclianus.

References
 
 

4th-century Roman governors of Egypt
4th-century Romans
Illyrian people
Romans from unknown gentes